WWMJ (95.7 FM) is a radio station broadcasting a classic rock format. Licensed to Ellsworth, Maine, United States, the station serves the Bangor, Maine area. The station is currently owned by Townsquare Media. The station's competitors are WKIT in Brewer and WNSX in Winter Harbor.

History
The station went on the air as WDEA-FM on December 27, 1965.  On August 25, 1983, the station changed its call sign to the current WWMJ. Until Christmas 2005 the station was an oldies formatted station, known as Magic 95.7. The station also picked up New England Patriots football, after WFZX's contract ended.  WWMJ was also an affiliate of Imus in the Morning until his show was cancelled after Don Imus' comments about the Rutgers women's basketball team.

Previous logo
 (WWMJ's logo under previous classic hits format)

References

External links

WMJ
Radio stations established in 1965
1965 establishments in Maine
Townsquare Media radio stations
Classic rock radio stations in the United States